is a name used by three different characters who appear in the Tekken and Soulcalibur series of fighting games by Namco.

The first version of Yoshimitsu made his debut in the original Tekken in 1994. The second version of Yoshimitsu appeared in every Soulcalibur game since the 1998 self-titled installment except for 2012's Soulcalibur V, which instead features a third version of the character, informally known as Yoshimitsu II. All Yoshimitsus are their era's leader of the honorable Manji clan, practitioners of ninjutsu, and master swordsmen with a mask and mechanical prosthetic arms.

As Tekken is set in modern times while Soulcalibur takes place in a medieval fantasy setting, the first Soulcalibur Yoshimitsu was originally considered to be an ancestor to Tekkens Yoshimitsu; however, the introduction of Yoshimitsu II revealed that Yoshimitsus are willingly killed and replaced by a younger protégé as part of a secret ritual, in order to make "Yoshimitsu" appear immortal to outsiders. Therefore, the Tekken version of the character is implied to have inherited the mantle in a similar way. The characters have been well-received by critics.

Appearances

Tekken series

First and second game 
Yoshimitsu's first appearance was in 1994's original Tekken. Kunimitsu's story in Tekken 2 reveals that Yoshimitsu's blade is passed down through the Manji Clan's leaders. The clan is dedicated to helping the weak and fighting oppression. Upon the inauguration of a new leader, their predecessor is ritually sacrificed, and the blade absorbs the person's power and skill. In the game's story, Yoshimitsu enters the first tournament as a decoy so as to allow other Manji to steal the tournament's funds unobserved. During the tournament, Yoshimitsu learns of Ganryu, a sumo wrestler whose disrespectful attitude in the ring cost him his promotion to the rank of yokozuna. His base disrespect for the sumo code infuriates Yoshimitsu, who defeats him. Later, Yoshimitsu leads a raid on Dr. Bosconovitch's lab in order to steal his Eternal Energy device. Though Yoshimitsu loses his arm during the operation, Bosconovitch helps him escape and fits him with a mechanical prosthetic replacement. Grateful for his help, he tells Bosconovitch that he may call on him whenever he needs help. In Tekken 2, Yoshimitsu learns that Bosconovitch has been kidnapped by the Guiane Paklibutushitsu and enters the second Tekken tournament to rescue him. Also, Kunimitsu, Yoshimitsu's former Manji Clan second-in-command, returns to the tournament in order to steal the clan's tachi. Yoshimitsu defeats her and drops out of the tournament to rescue the doctor after learning his location.

Third game 
In Tekken 3, Yoshimitsu visits Bosconovitch, who is suffering from a disease that he caught when he built the Cold Sleep machine. Bosconovitch tells him that the disease can only be cured using the blood of Ogre, a god recently awakened from its deep slumber. Yoshimitsu then enters the King of Iron Fist Tournament 3 in order to obtain the blood. During the tournament, he is targeted by Bryan Fury, a cyborg sent to kill him (and capture Dr. Bosconovitch) by Dr. Abel, Bosconovitch's rival. Yoshimitsu manages to defeat Bryan. The outcome of Yoshimitsu's search for Ogre's blood is unknown, though he most likely succeeds.

Fourth and fifth games 
Two years later, during the events of Tekken 4, Yoshimitsu realizes that the future of his clan is waning due to a lack of necessary funds and manpower. Upon learning of The King of Iron Fist Tournament 4, he forms an alliance with Mishima Zaibatsu and enters the tournament. While Yoshimitsu is robbing the Mishima Zaibatsu mansion near the end of the tournament, he discovers an unconscious Bryan Fury. He takes him to Bosconovitch's lab so the doctor can transfer Bryan to a new body. Bosconovitch then injects Bryan with drugs to put him to a year-long sleep. However, when Yoshimitsu visits Bosconovitch's lab a month later, he finds it destroyed and many of his compatriots dead. An injured Dr. Bosconovitch tells him that Bryan woke up only a month after the injection and went on a rampage with his new body. Swearing revenge, Yoshimitsu enters the King of Iron Fist Tournament 5 (Tekken 5) to hunt Bryan.

Sixth and seventh games 
While trying to find Bryan, Yoshimitsu learns that his sword is weakening. As his sword is cursed, it will lose its power and drive its user insane if it does not kill evildoers for a prolonged amount of time. He decides to adopt a second sword called Fumaken, which has the ability to suppress the cursed sword's properties, and enters the King of Iron Fist Tournament 6 (Tekken 6) in order to restore the power of the cursed sword. Following the tournament's end and Jin Kazama's disappearance, Heihachi Mishima assumes the position of CEO of Mishima Zaibatsu. Yoshimitsu senses something amiss and decides to enter the King of Iron Fist Tournament 7 (Tekken 7) to confirm his suspicions.

Yoshimitsu also appears in other Tekken games, namely Tekken Tag Tournament, Tekken Card Challenge, Tekken Advance, Tekken Resolute, Tekken Tag Tournament 2, Tekken 3D: Prime Edition and Tekken Card Tournament.

Soulcalibur series

Another Yoshimitsu appears in Namco's Soulcalibur series, starting with 1998's Soulcalibur. After refusing power-hungry lord Oda Nobunaga's offer of alliance, Yoshimitsu discovers his village has been destroyed. In a battle with Nobunaga's army, Yoshimitsu loses his arm. He subsequently sets out to find the fabled weapon Soul Edge in order to have revenge against Nobunaga. In meditation, Yoshimitsu decides that if he were to give in to his hatred, he would be no better than Nobunaga or Nightmare. When he reaches the castle where Soul Edge is, he discovers it has been locked away with Soul Calibur.

In the Soul series, Yoshimitsu uses his beloved self-named katana and the Manji ninjutsu combat style, handed down through many generations in the Manji Clan. His weapon seems like a normal katana, but it has many unique features that accommodate the unique fighting style of the Manji. Since it was forged with secret Manji techniques, it cannot be replicated and is the last of its kind. After the massacre of his clan, Yoshimitsu swears an oath of vengeance to the weapon. He also uses the sashimono on his back as a striking weapon. In Soulcalibur II, Yoshimitsu discovers that his katana has been impregnated with corrupted energy from the castle, and so resolves to rid his blade of the evil. The katana was stolen by Voldo when Yoshimitsu was worn out from trying to fight its corruption. Fearing what would happen if the weapon wound up in the wrong hands, Yoshimitsu sets out to retrieve the katana, and in the process discovers a fragment of the Soul Edge. Wanting to destroy the fragments spread across the earth, Yoshimitsu forms a band of chivalrous thieves, known as the Manjitou, in order to do good and to find the remaining fragments.

Yoshimitsu returns in Soulcalibur III, in which he plans a robbery in order to steal a fragment of the Soul Edge. The robbery fails as Tira, a servant of Soul Edge and Nightmare, ambushes the thieves and takes the fragment. Later on, Tira murders one of his clan members, causing Yoshimitsu to seek her for revenge in Soulcalibur IV. By the time of Soulcalibur V, the first Yoshimitsu has been ritually executed and succeeded by a younger, eerily similar protégé (hailing from Taki's Fûma village), who shares his fighting style, voice, mannerisms, and his clockwork arm. This secret line of succession makes "Yoshimitsu" appear immortal to outsiders and is implied to continue into modern times with the Tekken incarnation of the character.

The original Yoshimitsu returns again in Soulcalibur VI, where he seeks to obtain Soul Edge to avenge his slain clan members. But after an encounter with Sophitia, Yoshimitsu fights back against his possessed sword and swears to create a band of righteous thieves to help the poor.

Other games
Yoshimitsu has appeared in other Namco games. His Tekken 3 incarnation is a bonus character available in Anna Kournikova's Smash Court Tennis for the PlayStation and his Tekken 3 "energy sword" is one of the game's unlockable secret tennis racquets. Yoshimitsu's sword is also an available weapon in the Tekken spin-off game Death by Degrees. He appears in the Capcom-made crossover game Street Fighter X Tekken, where his official tag partner is Raven. One of his alternate costumes in the game is M. Bison's uniform, and Capcom stated that a "rumor says" that after defeating Bison, Yoshimitsu also took his Psycho Power ability as his own. Despite his body being either revealed like his arms or face, his voice never changes. This was seen in the PC Mods cutscenes from Street Fighter X Tekken. Yoshitmitsu appears as a Spirit in the Nintendo crossover video game Super Smash Bros. Ultimate.

In other media
Yoshimitsu has brief cameos in the animated film Tekken: The Motion Picture. He also appears in the 2009 live-action film Tekken, portrayed by Gary Ray Stearns, where he fights and loses against Jin Kazama.

In 2006, Namco and MegaHouse released a Yoshimitsu figurine as part of a Tekken 5 set based on promotional artwork for the game. While not posable, the PVC figure came with equippable clothing modeled after those in the game. Two more figurines were made by Bandai in 2009, based on his appearance in Tekken 6. A statue of Yoshimitsu based on his appearance in Tekken Tag Tournament 2 was produced by Kotobukiya in 2012.

Design and gameplay
Yoshimitsu's name roughly translates to "Light of Happiness". His outfits often employ the kanji "宇" (Romaji: u, Pinyin: yǔ), which means "universe". In the Tekken series, Yoshimitsu's sword is usually depicted as a tachi. From Tekken 3 onwards, the sword emanates energy around the blade, giving it the appearance of a lightsaber. In some Tekken games, such as Tekken 4, he wields a normal katana.

According to Namco's official description, Yoshimitsu's fighting style "incorporates a blend of ninjutsu, sword attacks from kenjutsu, and special stances from kabuki dance. Wielding a sword, he has many attacks that utilize it. He can perform slashes with it, use it to impale his opponent, and rotate it with his mechanical left hand in a windmill manner (he can also use this method to fly)". He also possesses many moves with strange properties; his "harakiri" moves require a large portion of his own health to perform, and he and Lei Wulong are the only characters with the ability to restore health. Michael Harradence of PlayStation Universe considered Yoshimitsu and Bryan Fury to be a top pairing in Tekken Tag Tournament 2, in that "Bryan is your heavy hitter, with his meaty kicks and punches delivering some health-zapping blows, while Yoshimitsu can confuse and abuse his victims with some intricate juggles and mix-up combos."

Yoshimitsu's second sword in Tekken 6 gives him a revamped move set, making him an even harder character to learn to play. According to IGN, in Soulcalibur IV "new players are often at a loss as to how to handle the character, but once they get a handle on him, Yoshimitsu becomes a true force of nature."

Reception

Yoshimitsu has been positively received by gaming media for his design and characterization. Lucas Sullivan of GamesRadar rated him third on his 2012 selection of the "top 7 best fighting game characters", as his "most impressive trait is how frequently his costume changes." Jack Pooley of WhatCulture, in 2014, ranked him the ninth-greatest fighting game character, and among the genre's "most stylish" characters. Jesse Schedeen of IGN considered the character "just too awesome to be confined to one fighting game series." In 2013, Kevin Wong of Complex ranked him the ninth-best Tekken character out of twenty, calling him "easy to love", but, conversely, a "cheater": "Yoshimitsu's the only character who gets to use a sword, and an unblockable one at that." Rich Knight of Complex considered Yoshimitsu "out of place" in the Tekken series, but "one of the Soul series' best characters." In 2011, Machinima ranked Yoshimitsu as the seventh-best ninja in video games, while Play's Ian Dransfield listed the character among the top ten ninjas on PlayStation consoles: "He used to rob from the rich and give to the poor, but now he just dances around, balancing on the hilt of his sword and annoying whoever he’s fighting against". Lisa Foiles of The Escapist rated Yoshimitsu fifth in her 2014 list of the "top five katana wielders". Ian Garstang of Gaming Debugged commented in 2014: "Many a time gamers angrily walked away from a Tekken arcade machine or tossed a controller down in frustration after losing to this ninja master." In 2010, prior to the release of Street Fighter X Tekken, Michael Grimm of GamesRadar listed Sodom and the cyborg version of Yoshimitsu ("Both bring some pizzazz to the tired old samurai fashion scene") as a matchup he wanted to see in the game. Gergo Vas of Kotaku ranked Yoshimitsu eighth in his 2013 list of the "most insane" cyborgs in Japanese video games". Yoshimitsu was ranked by Den of Geek as the "5th best Tekken character", with comments "He’s a complete wildcard to Tekken who sort of fits but sort of doesn’t. He’s such a staple to that whole universe that even having one Tekken without him would feel wrong." He was also placed 5th on Paste list "The 30 Best Tekken Characters", with comments:"The master of makeovers, this enigmatic ninja has seen more costume changes during his tenure than a runway model. His unusual appearance is matched only by his equally strange fighting style." Additionally, Yoshimitsu was named by TheGamer as the "coolest Tekken character", stating "One of the most beloved characters in the series and one of the only characters to appear in every installment of Tekken, Yoshimitsu is one of the coolest fighting characters ever created." The same site also ranked him as the "14th strongest Tekken character in the franchise", with comments "Thanks to his skills as a ninja, Yoshimitsu has managed to appear invisible at times, as well as accomplishing victory over empowered beings like Bryan Fury. He might not be in the elite level, but he’s very close to it." He was named by Screen Rant as the "5th Best Tekken Character":"A seemingly immortal ninja, the most striking aspect about Yoshimitsu is his appearance, which changes in each game for mysterious reasons and the latest one is seemingly always cooler than the one before."

In 2011, UGO.com ranked Yoshimitsu's Tekken 5 "Blue" costume as the ninth-"Most Stylin' Alternate Costume" in gaming. Gavin Jasper of 4thletter.net placed Yoshimitsu's Tekken 4 ending, in which he cons Heihachi and the evil Mishima Zaibatsu corporation out of a large sum of money, 33rd in his 2013 ranking of the top 200 fighting game endings. Angelo Dargenio of Arcade Sushi ranked Yoshimitsu's suicide move as the seventeenth-"most iconic fighting game move", but described it as "never actually … a useful move in combat, because it does cost you a huge chunk of life." Prima Games ranked it the fourteenth-"greatest fighting move in video game history", commenting: "Hey, if you're gonna go, you might as well take someone with you, right? "

Yoshimitsu has received cooler reception from fans; he was rated the sixth-most popular Soul character in a 2002 poll held by Namco prior to the release of Soulcalibur II with 4.56% of the votes, seven percentage points behind fifth-place Cervantes de Leon. In another poll from Namco in 2012, Yoshimitsu was the 22nd-most requested out of 54 Tekken characters to be playable in Street Fighter X Tekken, with 5503 (6.23%) of 88,280 fan votes.

References

Action film characters
Amputee characters in video games
Cyborg characters in video games
Fictional characters who can duplicate themselves
Fictional characters with immortality
Fictional Japanese people in video games
Fictional martial artists in video games
Fictional professional thieves
Fictional kenjutsuka
Fictional Ninjutsu practitioners
Fictional samurai
Fictional ninja
Fictional swordfighters in video games
Fictional people of Sengoku-period Japan
Male characters in video games
Namco protagonists
Ninja characters in video games
Soulcalibur series characters
Tekken characters
Video game characters introduced in 1994
Video game characters who can teleport
Video game characters who can turn invisible
Video game characters with superhuman strength
Video game characters who can move at superhuman speeds
Video game characters with slowed ageing
Video game mascots
Vigilante characters in video games
Fictional code names